Hoa Thanh may refer to several places in Vietnam, including:

Hòa Thành
Hòa Thành, a district-level town of Tây Ninh Province
Hòa Thành, Cà Mau, a rural commune of Cà Mau
Hòa Thành, Phú Yên, a rural commune of Đông Hòa District
Hòa Thành, Đắk Lắk, a rural commune of Krông Bông District
Hòa Thành, Đồng Tháp, a rural commune of Lai Vung District
Former Hòa Thành township, the district capital of Hòa Thành District, dissolved in 2020 to form the ward of Long Hoa.

Hòa Thạnh
Hòa Thạnh, Tân Phú, a ward of Tân Phú District, Ho Chi Minh City
Hòa Thạnh, Tây Ninh, a rural commune of Châu Thành District, Tây Ninh Province
Hòa Thạnh, Vĩnh Long, a rural commune of Tam Bình District

Others
Hóa Thanh, a rural commune of Minh Hóa District